Deniz Yılmaz (born 12 January 2000) is a Turkish professional footballer who plays as a defender for TFF Third League club Bursa Yıldırımspor.

Professional career
On 4 October, Yılmaz signed his first professional contract with  Fenerbahçe. Yılmaz made his debut for Fenerbahçe in a 1-0 Europa League loss to FC Spartak Trnava on 13 December 2018.

References

External links
 
 
 

2000 births
People from Fatih
Footballers from Istanbul
Living people
Turkish footballers
Association football defenders
Fenerbahçe S.K. footballers
Kahramanmaraşspor footballers
TFF Second League players
TFF Third League players